Simon Marples (born 30 July 1975 in Sheffield) is an English former football defender.

Marples was on the books of Sheffield Wednesday and Rotherham United as a youngster. He then joined non-league side Stocksbridge Park Steels in 1994, working his way into the first team after impressive performances in the reserves.

In 1999 Marples moved to Doncaster Rovers for £12,000, which remains a club record fee received for a Stocksbridge player. Marples impressed so much in his early weeks at the club that he attracted interest from Premier League clubs, with Rovers valuing him at more than £200,000.

Maples stayed with Rovers and was part of the teams that won the Football Conference playoffs and the Division 3 championship in successive seasons from 2003 to 2004.

He signed for Chester in the summer of 2006 on a free transfer and over the next two years would again fail to find the net in more than 50 first–team appearances. In March 2008 he was placed on 'gardening leave' at Chester, believed to be following a dispute over his non-selection in the team. He did not play for the club again and was released at the end of the season.

References

External links

1975 births
Living people
Footballers from Sheffield
English footballers
Doncaster Rovers F.C. players
Chester City F.C. players
Stocksbridge Park Steels F.C. players
Alfreton Town F.C. players
English Football League players
Association football fullbacks
National League (English football) players